KWES-FM (93.5 FM, "The West 93.5") is a radio station licensed to serve Ruidoso, New Mexico.  The station is owned by Walton Stations New Mexico, Inc.  It airs a classic country music format.

The station was assigned the KWES-FM call letters by the Federal Communications Commission on July 17, 2000. Before this, it had held the adorned KWES call letters since November 15, 1990.

References

External links
KWES-FM official website
KEWS Facebook

WES-FM
Classic country radio stations in the United States
Lincoln County, New Mexico